Diderik Batens (born 15 November 1944), is a Belgian logician and epistemologist at the University of Ghent, known chiefly for his work on adaptive and paraconsistent logics. His epistemological views may be broadly characterized as fallibilist.

Bibliography

References

External links 
 Official page
 

1944 births
20th-century Belgian philosophers
21st-century Belgian philosophers
Epistemologists
Flemish academics
Flemish philosophers
Living people
Belgian logicians
Paraconsistent logic